Kirovkənd or Kirovkend may refer to:
Həsənsu, Azerbaijan
Ənvər Məmmədxanlı, Azerbaijan
Kirovkend, Saatly, Azerbaijan